This is a list of film festivals that take place (or took place) in North America.

Canada
 List of film festivals in Canada

Caribbean

Central America

Mexico

United States
List of film festivals in the United States

See also
List of film festivals

References

External links

 Movie festivals and events worldwide at the Internet Movie Database
 The Big List of Horror Film Festivals

North America